Amorbia cordobana is a species of moth of the family Tortricidae. It is found in Veracruz, Mexico.

The length of the forewings is 8.4–8.5 mm for males and 9–9.5 mm for females. The ground colour of the forewings is straw yellow and the hindwings are beige. Adults are on wing in April, July, August and October.

Etymology
The species name refers to Córdoba in Veracruz, Mexico, where most of the paratypes were collected.

References

Moths described in 2007
Sparganothini
Moths of Central America